The Woolf Institute is an academic institute in Cambridge, England. Founded in 1998 by Dr Edward Kessler MBE and the Revd Professor Martin Forward, and now located in central Cambridge on the Westminster College Site, it is dedicated to the study of interfaith relations between Jews, Christians and Muslims. Using research and education to explore the relationship between religion and society, it aims to foster greater understanding and tolerance.

Beginning as the Centre for Jewish-Christian Relations, the institute expanded throughout its history to include the Centre for the Study of Muslim-Jewish Relations and the Centre for Policy and Public Education. In 2010, these centers were combined and renamed as The Woolf Institute in honour of Lord Harry Woolf, a patron of the institute and former Lord Chief Justice of England and Wales. 

The institute is an associate member of the Cambridge Theological Federation which brings together eleven institutions through which people of different denominations, including Anglican, Methodist, Eastern Orthodox, Reformed and Roman Catholic, train for various forms of Christian ministry and service.

History 
The Woolf Institute was established in 1998 as The Center for Jewish-Christian Relations to "provide an academic framework and space in which people could tackle issues of religious difference constructively." In 2010, it combined with The Centre for the Study of Muslim-Jewish Relations and the Centre for Policy and Public Education, and the institute was renamed to The Woolf Institute.

In 2019, the institute set out to explore how to tackle extremism in the United Kingdom, and to find a way to measure different levels of extremism.

Teaching

The Woolf Institute works together with the Cambridge Commonwealth Trust and the Cambridge Overseas Trust to offer the Woolf Institute Cambridge Scholarship, a PhD scholarship for the study of relations between Jews, Christians and Muslims. It also contributes to the MPhil in Middle East Studies at the University of Cambridge, and offers a Professional Doctorate in collaboration with the Cambridge Theological Federation and Anglia Ruskin University.

Patrons 
 The Rt Hon Lord Harry Woolf, CH, PC
 The Rt Hon Justin Welby, Archbishop of Canterbury
 Rabbi Ephraim Mirvis, Chief Rabbi of the United Hebrew Congregations of the Commonwealth
 Cardinal Vincent Nichols, Archbishop of Westminster
 HRH Prince Hassan of Jordan
 Archbishop Gregorios, Archbishop of Thyateira and Great Britain
 Rev Dr Hugh Osgood, Free Church Moderator
 Rabbi Baroness Julia Neuberger DBE
 Rabbi Joseph Dweck, Senior Rabbi S&P Congregation
 Rabbi Lord Jonathan Sacks

Inter-faith patrons 
 Baroness Elizabeth Butler-Sloss GBE
 Dr Richard Stone OBE

Honorary vice-presidents 
 Rev Dominic Fenton (Chair of Trustees: 2003-2007)
 Mr John Pickering (Chair of Trustees: 2007-2010)
 Lord Khalid Hameed CBE (Chair of Trustees: 2010-2016)

See also

Commission on Religion and Belief in British Public Life
Religion in the United Kingdom
Cambridge Theological Federation

References

Bible colleges, seminaries and theological colleges in England
Interfaith organizations
Research institutes in the United Kingdom